Satkhol village is situated in Ramgarh Block of District Nainital in the state of Uttarakhand, India.

Background 

Satkhol village is located 55 km away from district headquarters Nainital and is dependent on nearest town Bhowali which is 45 kilometers away for major economic activities. The village which is a good tourist destination has a population of 518 peoples consisting of 275 males and 243 females  is spread over 262.84 hectares. Total literacy rate of village is 80.31% with males being 86.18% and females being 73.66%.

Tourist Places 

 Sri RamChandara Mission,Sathkol.

Important people 

 Salman Khurshid

See also 

 Villages in India.

References

External links 
 Official Website

Uttarakhand
Villages in Nainital district